The 2010 Big Ten Conference football season was the 115th season for the Big Ten. The conference started its season on Thursday, September 2, as conference member Minnesota traveled to Murfreesboro, Tennessee to face Middle Tennessee, and Ohio State hosted the Thundering Herd of Marshall. The conference’s other 9 teams began their respective 2010 season of NCAA Division I FBS (Football Bowl Subdivision) competition on Saturday, September 4.  It was also the final season for the conference before the Nebraska Cornhuskers joined the conference from the Big 12 the following season.

Preseason
After a 2010 NFL Draft, which saw 34 Big Ten athletes selected, 12 2009 first-team All-Big Ten selections, 8 second-team selections and 33 honorable mention selections returned for the 2010 season.  The Big Ten held the 2010 Football Media Days and 39th annual Kickoff Luncheon on Monday and Tuesday, August 2–3.

Schedules
In a given year, each Big Ten team will play eight of the other Big Ten teams. Thus for any given team in a given year, there are two others which will not be competed against. Below is the breakdown of each team and its two "no-plays" for 2010:

Illinois: Iowa, Wisconsin 
Indiana: Michigan State, Minnesota 
Iowa: Illinois, Purdue 
Michigan: Minnesota, Northwestern 
Michigan State: Indiana, Ohio State 
Minnesota: Indiana, Michigan 
Northwestern: Michigan, Ohio State 
Ohio State: Michigan State, Northwestern 
Penn State: Purdue, Wisconsin 
Purdue: Iowa, Penn State 
Wisconsin: Illinois, Penn State

Rankings
In Weeks 3 and 4, the Big Ten had six teams ranked in both polls for the first time since September 13, 2004.

Spring games
April 17
Indiana
Iowa
Michigan
Purdue
Wisconsin

April 24
Illinois
Michigan State
Minnesota
Northwestern
Ohio State
Penn State

Season

Homecoming games
October 2
Penn State @ Iowa 7:05 p.m. CT (Iowa's record in homecoming games is 52-41-5)  
Northwestern @ Minnesota  11:00 a.m. CT (Minnesota's record in homecoming games is 54-33-3) 

October 9
Illinois @ Penn State 12:00 p.m. ET (Penn State's record in homecoming games is 65-20-5) 
Minnesota @ Wisconsin 11:00 a.m. ET (Wisconsin's record in homecoming games is 52-45-5) 

October 16
Arkansas State @ Indiana 12:00 p.m. ET (Indiana's record in homecoming games is 43-48-6) 
Iowa @ Michigan 3:30 p.m. ET (Michigan's record in homecoming games is 83-26) 
Illinois @ Michigan State 12:00 p.m. ET (Michigan State's record in homecoming games is 61-30-3) 
Minnesota @ Purdue 12:00 p.m. ET (Purdue's record in homecoming games is 48-35-4) 

October 23
Indiana @ Illinois 11:00 a.m. CT (Illinois's record in homecoming games is 42-55-2)  
Michigan State @ Northwestern 11:00 a.m. CT  
Purdue @ Ohio State 12:00 p.m. ET (Ohio State's record in homecoming games is 64-19-5) 

On September 25, Joe Paterno became the fifth head coach to earn 150 victories as a member of the Big Ten Conference. On October 9, Jim Tressel became the first Big Ten head coach to earn 100 victories in his first ten seasons, surpassing Bo Schembechler and Lloyd Carr who achieved the milestone in their 11th seasons and he did so in the third fewest games (121), behind Schembechler and Fielding Yost (119) and ahead of Henry Williams (123). (The wins for the 2010 season were later vacated.)  On November 6, Paterno became the first FBS coach to total 400 career wins.

Big Ten vs. BCS matchups

Attendance
Week 3 attendance (September 18) set an all-time Big Ten single-day attendance record with an average of 78,844.  All eight games had crowds of over 50,000; Michigan State (78,411), Wisconsin (81,332), Ohio State (105,075) and Michigan (110,187) had sellouts; and 100,610 patrons were in attendance for Penn State. It surpassed the September 3, 2005 eight-game single-day average of 76,475.  On October 9, the Big Ten set a five-game attendance record of 88,034, surpassing the 87,620, set on October 28, 1995. Michigan, Ohio State, Penn State and Wisconsin all hosted sellouts.

Bowl games
The following is the Big Ten Bowl game schedule.

Head coaches

 Ron Zook, Illinois
 Bill Lynch, Indiana
 Kirk Ferentz, Iowa
 Rich Rodriguez, Michigan
 Mark Dantonio, Michigan State
 Tim Brewster, Minnesota (first 7 games) and Jeff Horton, Minnesota (last 5 games)

 Pat Fitzgerald, Northwestern
 Jim Tressel, Ohio State
 Joe Paterno, Penn State
 Danny Hope, Purdue
 Bret Bielema, Wisconsin

2011 NFL Draft

Awards

Notes

References